Mahishasura is a bovine asura in Hinduism. He is depicted in literature to be a deceitful demon who pursued his evil ways by shape-shifting. Mahishasura was the son of Mahisi (Buffalo) and the great-grandson of Brahmarshi Kashyapa. He was ultimately killed by goddess Durga with her trishula (trident) after which she gained the epithet Mahishasuramardini ("Slayer of Mahishasura"). 

The Navaratri ("Nine Nights") festival eulogises this battle between Mahishasura and Durga, culminating in Vijaya Dasami, a celebration of his ultimate defeat. This story of the "triumph of good over evil" carries profound symbolism in Hinduism, particularly Shaktism, and is both narrated as well as reenacted from the Devi Mahatmya at many South and Southeast Asian Hindu temples.

Legend 

Mahishasura is a Sanskrit word composed of Mahisha meaning “buffalo” and asura meaning “demon”, translating to “Buffalo Demon”. As an asura, Mahishasura waged war against the devas, as the devas and asuras were perpetually in conflict. Mahishasura had gained the boon that no man could kill him. In the battles between the devas and the demons (asuras), the devas, led by Indra, were defeated by Mahishasura. Subjected to defeat, the devas assembled in the mountains where their combined divine energies coalesced into goddess Durga. The newborn Durga led a battle against Mahishasura, riding a lion, and killed him. Thereafter, she was named Mahishasuramardini, meaning The Killer of Mahishasura. According to the Lakshmi Tantra, it is the goddess Lakshmi who slays Mahishasura instantaneously, and extolling her feat is described to offer everlasting supremacy.

Mahishasura's legend is told in the major texts of the Shaktism traditions known as the Devi Mahatmya, which is part of Markandeya Purana. The story of Mahishasura is being told in the chapter where Markandeya is narrating the story of the birth of Savarnika Manu. As per the Markandeya Purana, the story of Mahishasura was narrated in the second Manvantara (approximately 1.3 billion years ago, as per the Vishnu Purana) by Maharishi Medha to a king named Soorut, as an incident which occurred in times ancient for even the 2nd Manvantara. Therefore this ostensibly dates the Mahishasura story to several billion years ago, as per the narrative of the Markandeya Purana. A proper explanation of a manvantara as a unit of time is given in the Vishnu Purana. The geography, society, and the living things on earth were all different as compared to the social set up described in other Hindu mythology. Mahishasura is described as an evil being who can change his outer form, but never his demonic goals. According to Christopher Fuller, Mahishasura represents the forces of ignorance and chaos hidden by outer appearances. The symbolism is carried in Hindu art found in South Asia and South-East Asia (e.g., Javanese art), where Durga is shown as a serene, calm, collected and graceful symbol of good as she pierces the heart and kills the scared, overwhelmed and outwitted Mahishasura.

Art

Durga slaying Mahishasura is a prominent theme which was sculpted in various caves and temples across India. Some of the prominent representations are seen at the Mahishasuramardini caves in Mahabalipuram, the Ellora Caves, in the entrance of Rani ki vav Hoysaleswara Temple in Halebidu and many more temples across India. The worship of Durga during Durga Puja in Bihar, West Bengal, Jharkhand, Odisha and other eastern states is represented in Pandal which depict Durga killing Mahishasura. The legend of Mahishasura has also been inspiration to films, plays and dance dramas.

Etymology of Mysore

The popular legend is that Mysore (Mahishooru) gets its name from Mahishasuramardini, a manifestation of goddess Durga. The Buffalo demon Mahishasura, states the regional tradition, had terrified the local population. It is believed that goddess Durga (Chamundeshwari) killed Mahishasura on top of the Chamundi Hills. The spot was constructed as the Chamundeshwari Temple in Mysuru, an event that is annually celebrated at Navaratri and Mysuru Dasara. The British Era in India saw the name of "Mahishooru" change to "Mysore" and later Kannadized into "Mysuru".

The temple of the city's guardian deity, Chamundeshwari, has a giant statue of Mahishasura on the hill facing the city. The earliest mention of Mysore in recorded history may be traced to 245 B.C., i.e., to the period of Ashoka when on the conclusion of the third Buddhist convocation, a team was dispatched to Mahisha Mandala.

Gallery

See also
 Raktabīja
 Sumbha and Nisumbha
 Rambha (asura)
 Chanda and Munda
 Dhumralochana
 Sugriva (asura)

References

Further reading
Hindu Goddesses: Vision of the Divine Feminine in the Hindu Religious Traditions, David Kinsley.
 Mahishasura Mardini Stotram (Prayer to the Goddess who killed Mahishasura), Sri Sri Sri Shankara Bhagavatpadacharya.

External links

 Devī Māhātmya by Swami Sivananda at Divine Life Society

Asura
Animals in Hinduism
Water buffalo